Shadab Majeed (born 7 June 1997) is a Pakistani cricketer. He made his first-class debut on 8 December 2020, for Northern, in the 2020–21 Quaid-e-Azam Trophy. He made his List A debut on 19 March 2022, for Northern in the 2021–22 Pakistan Cup.

References

External links
 

1997 births
Living people
Pakistani cricketers
Place of birth missing (living people)